Vox Sanguinis, formerly known as the Bulletin of the Central Laboratory of the Blood Transfusion Service of the Dutch Red Cross, is a peer-reviewed medical journal covering hematology. It was established in 1953 and published 8 times per year by Wiley-Blackwell on behalf of the International Society of Blood Transfusion. The editor-in-chief is Miquel Lozano (Clinic Barcelona Sección de Hemotherapia). According to the Journal Citation Reports, the journal has a 2019 impact factor of 2.347, ranking it 46th out of 76 journals in the category "Hematology".

References

Hematology journals
Wiley-Blackwell academic journals
Publications established in 1953
English-language journals
8 times per year journals